Victoria Barr (born 1937) is an American artist, painter, and set designer.

Life 
Victoria Barr was born in New York, NY, in 1937 to the curator and art historian Alfred H. Barr, Jr. and art historian Margaret Scolari Barr. As a child, she spent summers in Greensboro, Vermont, with her parents, as well as attended a number of residential camps focusing on the arts. Barr often traveled to Europe with her parents from the age of 14 onwards, meeting influential artists like Pablo Picasso, Henri Matisse, and Marc Chagall and collectors like Peggy Guggenheim. For high school, she went to Milton Academy in Milton, Massachusetts. After high school, she briefly attended Radcliffe College (1955–1956). Then Barr studied at the Parsons School of Design, focused on graphics and advertising. There Barr took classes in art history from Leo Steinberg and in color theory from Sewell Sillman, who was Josef Albers' studio assistant at Yale. Afterward meeting Sillman, Barr decided to attend the Yale Art School, graduating in 1961. Barr started at Yale working to be a commercial artist in graphics then started taking painting classes from Neil Welliver, then with Albers, another one of his assistants Cy Twombly, as well as Bernard Chaet and William Bailey. Barr lived and worked in Aspen for some time in the early 1960s. Back in New York, she worked for a time as a secretary to the art dealer Steven Spector 

Then in 1964, Barr traveled to Paris, France on a Fulbright scholarship, along with fellow artist and Fulbright scholars Nancy Graces, who would later marry Richard Serra who joined their group in Paris, and Philip Glass. After two years in Paris, Barr returned to the US in 1966 and got a job at the Museum of Natural History in the exhibition's department for a year. Barr later taught courses at Hunter College and at Barnard. Barr still lives in New York, NY.

Artwork 
Barr is best known for her abstract landscapes, which come out of a tradition of post-war American Abstract Expressionism, Lyrical Abstraction, and Color Field painting. Her early works she described as "filmstrip-type" paintings and later "stained paintings." She also connected her work to an interest in landscape to Chinese landscape painting in terms of different layers of gradation. Her work often deals with her interest in understanding the world, outside of the European Christianity. Her extensive travels throughout Europe, South and East Asia, and the Pacific were part of this research project.

In 1970, Barr's work was shown at the John B Meyer's Gallery with work in acrylic and watercolor and a series of "stained paintings" at Larry Aldrich. In 1981, she had a show at the Haber Theodore gallery in New York. She has works in a number of important collections, including Surfacing (1971) in the Whitney Museum collection and the University of North Dakota's collection.

References 

American artists
20th-century American painters
American women artists
American women painters
1937 births
Living people
21st-century American painters
20th-century American women
21st-century American women